Austrapoda is a genus of moths of the family Limacodidae.

Species
Austrapoda beijingensis C.S. Wu, 2011
Austrapoda dentatus (Oberthür, 1879)
Austrapoda hepatica Inoue, 1987
Austrapoda seres Solovyev, 2009

References 

 , 2011: Six new species and twelve newly recorded species of Limacodidae from China (Lepidoptera: Zygaenoidea). Acta Zootaxonomica Sinica 36 (2)
 , 2009, Notes on South-East Asian Limacodidae (Lepidoptera, Zygaenoidea) with one new genus and eleven new species. Tijdschrift voor Entomology 152 (1): 167-183.

Limacodidae genera
Limacodidae